The Church of Saint Andrew is a former Presbyterian church building in Rodney Street, Liverpool, Merseyside, England. It was part of the Church of Scotland. The church is recorded in the National Heritage List for England as a designated Grade II* listed building, and before redevelopment was on its Heritage at Risk Register.

History
The body of the church was designed by Daniel Stewart, the surveyor of the Scottish Presbyterian Church committee of management, and the façade by John Foster, the senior surveyor of the Corporation of Liverpool. The foundation stone was laid on 17 June 1823, and the church opened the following year on 3 December.

The church closed in 1975, with the Church of Scotland congregation meeting in the Radcliffe Room at Liverpool Cathedral. The congregation disbanded following a special service on 27 November 2016, where the Rt Rev Dr Russell Barr, Moderator of the General Assembly of the Church of Scotland preached.

The building was seriously damaged by fire in 1983. Since that time, one of the towers has had to be demolished because it was unsafe. The church and its surrounding graveyard were purchased privately in 1988, with plans to restore the building and open it as offices and medical consulting rooms.

In 2008, after spending £100,000 on legal fees to acquire the site and a further £150,000 since on emergency repairs, Liverpool City Council acquired the site. After facing an uncertain future, it was placed on the Buildings At Risk Register, with its condition stated to be "very poor".

In December 2011 it was announced that the church would be restored and developed into accommodation for 100 students, with redevelopment work to include the rebuilding of one of the church's turrets and a remodelling of the exterior.

As of 2015 the facade of the building has been completely restored and successfully preserved, with the former building now rebuilt to provide student accommodation known as "St Andrew's Place".

Architecture

The body of the church is constructed in rendered brick, and contains round-headed windows.  The façade is in ashlar in Greek Revival style.  It contains a recessed portico with Ionic columns, and square towers at the corners surmounted by small domes.  In the National Heritage List for England it is described as "a distinguished building in a desperate condition".

Mackenzie Monument

Adjacent to the church in the churchyard is a monument to William Mackenzie, a railway contractor who died in 1851.  It is in the shape of a pyramid, is constructed in granite, and was erected in 1868.  Facing the street is a blind entrance flanked by uprights supporting a lintel containing a bronze plaque.  The structure is a Grade II listed building.

There is a tradition, popularized by the famous Liverpool writer Tom Slemen that, as Mackenzie was a gambling man, he sold his soul to the Devil, and that his body was placed in a seating position above ground within the pyramid, in order that the Devil might not claim him.  His ghost is said to haunt Rodney Street.

See also

Grade II* listed buildings in Liverpool – City Centre

References

Church of St Andrew
Church of St Andrew
Grade II* listed churches in Merseyside
Churches completed in 1824
Church of Scotland churches in England
19th-century Presbyterian churches
Presbyterian churches in England
Former churches in Merseyside
Church ruins in England
19th-century Church of Scotland church buildings
19th-century churches in the United Kingdom